A waterskin is a receptacle used to hold water. Normally made of a sheep or goat skin, it retains water naturally and therefore was very useful in desert crossings until the invention of the canteen, though waterskins are still used in some parts of the world. Though it may have been used over 5000 years ago by tribal peoples, the first pictures of it are from ancient Assyrians, who used the bladders as floats in 3000 B.C. It also was used by large ancient empires such as Rome before the advent of the canteen.

Modern waterskins are often made of various plastic or rubber impregnated canvases, or sometimes simply thicker transparent plastics, and are often called water-pouches, water bags, or water bladders. Such modern waterskins offer many features, such as detachable straw-hoses, valves, refill openings of various widths, various closures and handles, styles of covering or cases, and removable cases or carry pouches.

See also
Bota bag
Goatskin (material)
Colambre
Wineskin
Mashk
CamelBak

Containers
Packaging
Bottles